Hannaphota distincta is a species of beetle in the family Carabidae, the only species in the genus Hannaphota.

References

Platyninae